Guy Henri (also spelled Guy-Henry or Guy Henry, 6 January 1922 – 9 July 2002) was a French actor, notable for roles in films including the uncredited appearance in Légère et court vêtue. He was active from 1940 to 1970.

Selected filmography

 La Comédie du bonheur (1940) - (uncredited)
 Histoire de rire (1941)
 Miss Bonaparte (1942)
 À vos ordres, Madame (1942) - Minor rôle (uncredited)
 Pontcarral (1942)
 Les Visiteurs du Soir (1942) - (uncredited)
 Haut le vent (1942)
 Le comte de Monte Cristo, 1ère époque: Edmond Dantès (1943)
 Captain Fracasse (1943) - (uncredited)
 Cadet Rousselle (1954)
 The Women Couldn't Care Less (1954)

External links

1922 births
2002 deaths
French male film actors